St David's Church, Fairwater is a Lutheran church in Fairwater, Cardiff, Wales.

There has been a Lutheran community in central Cardiff since the 19th Century, but that in Fairwater is far more recent, forming only after new housing development in the post-war years. The church was designed by Vernon Kinch of Alex Gordon and Partners, and was completed in 1961. it belongs to the Evangelical Lutheran Church of England, and became a grade II listed building in 2007. Aside from some minor changes in joinery and the replacement of the original windows, the church is largely unaltered.

References

Grade II listed churches in Cardiff
Churches completed in 1961